Kyla Kenedy  (born February 4, 2003) is an American actress. She is known for her roles as Izzie on the television film Raising Izzie, and Mika Samuels on AMC horror series The Walking Dead. In 2016, she began playing Dylan DiMeo on the ABC sitcom Speechless, which ran for three seasons through 2019.  In 2021, Kenedy was cast as Orly Bremer in the NBC sitcom Mr. Mayor.

Filmography

Awards and nominations

References

External links

2003 births
Living people
21st-century American actresses
American child actresses
American film actresses
American television actresses